Moustafa El Sirty (born 25 October 2001 in Cairo) is an Egyptian professional squash player. As of May 2019, he was ranked number 156 in the world. He won the 2019 CIB El Shams Tour 1 tournament.

References

2001 births
Living people
Egyptian male squash players
Sportspeople from Cairo
21st-century Egyptian people